Arenaria livermorensis, common name Livermore sandwort, is a plant species endemic to the Davis Mountains in Jeff Davis County in western Texas. It grows in cracks in cliff faces at elevations of 2100–2500 m.

Arenaria livermorensis is a perennial herb growing close to the ground and forming a mat, rather resembling a moss. Stems can attain a length of 4 cm. Leaves are needle-like, narrow and rigid, up to 6 mm long, hairless but with peg-like cilia along the margins, green and shiny. Flowers are solitary in the axils of the leaves, with green sepals and no petals.

References

livermorensis
Flora of Texas